Gorodetsky (masculine), Gorodetskaya (feminine), or Gorodetskoye (neuter) is the name of several rural localities in Russia:
Gorodetsky, Altai Krai, a settlement in Vozdvizhensky Selsoviet of Kulundinsky District of Altai Krai
Gorodetsky, Nizhny Novgorod Oblast, a settlement in Nikolo-Pogostinsky Selsoviet of Gorodetsky District of Nizhny Novgorod Oblast
Gorodetskoye, Republic of Bashkortostan, a selo in Beketovsky Selsoviet of Yermekeyevsky District of the Republic of Bashkortostan
Gorodetskoye, Novgorod Oblast, a village in Morkhovskoye Settlement of Kholmsky District of Novgorod Oblast
Gorodetskoye, Oryol Oblast, a selo in Yarishchensky Selsoviet of Kolpnyansky District of Oryol Oblast
Gorodetskoye, Skopinsky District, Ryazan Oblast, a selo in Shelemishevsky Rural Okrug of Skopinsky District of Ryazan Oblast
Gorodetskoye, Starozhilovsky District, Ryazan Oblast, a village in Stolpnyansky Rural Okrug of Starozhilovsky District of Ryazan Oblast
Gorodetskoye, Smolensk Oblast, a village in Syrokorenskoye Rural Settlement of Roslavlsky District of Smolensk Oblast
Gorodetskoye, Ulyanovsk Oblast, a selo in Ignatovsky Settlement Okrug of Maynsky District, Ulyanovsk Oblast